Aparallactus capensis, or the Cape centipede-eater, is a species of venomous rear-fanged snake in the Atractaspididae family.

Geographic range
It is found in South Africa, Eswatini, Botswana, Zimbabwe, Mozambique, and the Democratic Republic of the Congo.

Description
Yellow or pale reddish-brown dorsally, with or without a blackish vertebral line. Yellowish white ventrally. Neck and top of head black, with or without a yellowish crossbar behind the parietals. Sides of head yellowish, with the shields bordering the eye black.

A portion of rostral visible from above ⅓ as long as its distance from the frontal. Frontal 1½ to 1⅔ as long as broad, much longer than its distance from the end of the snout, a little shorter than the parietals. Nasal entire, in contact with the preocular. One postocular. Seven upper labials, third and fourth entering the eye, fifth in contact with the parietal. Mental in contact with the anterior chin shields, which are as long as or a little longer than the posterior. Anterior chin shields in contact with three lower labials.

Dorsal scales in 15 rows, smooth. Ventrals 138–166; anal plate entire; subcaudals 37–53, entire.

References

Smith, A. 1849. ''Illustrations of the Zoology of South Africa, 3 (Reptiles). Smith, Elder, and Co. London. p. 16.

External Links
 iNaturalist page

Atractaspididae
Snakes of Africa
Reptiles described in 1849